Thiella Dromolaxia is a Cypriot association football club based in Dromolaxia, located in the Nicosia District. Its colours are red and blue. It has 1 participations in Cypriot Fourth Division (2006–07 Cypriot Fourth Division).

It also has a futsal team.

References

Football clubs in Cyprus
Association football clubs established in 1959
1959 establishments in Cyprus
Futsal clubs in Cyprus